Achille Graffigna (5 May 1816, San Martino dall'Argine - 19 July 1896, Padua) was an Italian composer and conductor. He composed a total of 18 operas, two of which premiered at La Scala in Milan: La conquista di Granata (1839) and Ildegonda e Rizzardo (1841). Several of his operas premiered at the Teatro Regio di Torino as well where he was also active as a conductor.

References

1816 births
1896 deaths
Italian classical composers
Italian male classical composers
Italian conductors (music)
Italian male conductors (music)
Italian opera composers
Male opera composers
19th-century classical composers
Musicians from the Province of Mantua
19th-century conductors (music)
19th-century Italian composers